Jeff Walker may refer to:

 Jeff Walker (musician) (born 1969), British musician in grindcore/death metal band Carcass
 Jeffrey Walker (actor) (born 1982), Australian actor and director
 Jeffrey Walker (cricketer) (born 1960), Australian cricketer
 Jeffrey N. Walker, adjunct professor at Brigham Young University
 Jeff Walker (American football) (born 1963), American football player
 Jerry Jeff Walker (1942–2020), American country music singer and songwriter
 Jeffrey Walker (chief executive), American CEO

See also
 Geoff Walker (disambiguation)